The politics of the Cook Islands takes place in a framework of a parliamentary representative democracy within a constitutional monarchy. The Monarch of New Zealand, represented in the Cook Islands by the King or Queen's Representative, was the Head of State; the prime minister is the head of government of a multi-party system. The nation is self-governing and are fully responsible for internal and foreign affairs. Since 2001, the Cook Islands has run its own foreign and defence policy. Executive power is exercised by the government, while legislative power is vested in both the government and the islands' parliament.  The judiciary is independent of the executive and the legislatures.

Constitution
The Constitution of the Cook Islands took effect on August 4, 1965, when the Cook Islands became a self-governing territory in free association with New Zealand. The anniversary of these events in 1965 is commemorated annually on Constitution Day, with week long activities known as Te Maeva Nui Celebrations locally.

Executive 

| King || Charles III || || 8 September 2022
|-
| King's Representative || Tom Marsters || || 27 July 2013
|-
| Prime Minister || Mark Brown || CIP || 1 October 2020
|}

Ten years of rule by the Cook Islands Party (CIP) came to an end 18 November 1999 with the resignation of Prime Minister Joe Williams. Williams had led a minority government since October 1999 when the New Alliance Party (NAP) left the government coalition and joined the main opposition Democratic Party (DAP). On 18 November 1999, DAP leader Dr. Terepai Maoate was sworn in as prime minister. He was succeeded by his co-partisan Robert Woonton. When Dr Woonton lost his seat in the 2004 elections, Jim Marurai took over. In the 2010 elections, the CIP regained power and Henry Puna was sworn in as prime minister on 30 November 2010. His Deputy, Mark Brown, succeeded Puna in 2020, when Puna was elected Secretary General of the Cook Islands.

Prime Minister Mark Brown was reelected in 2022 with an increased majority

Legislature 

The Parliament of the Cook Islands has 24 members, elected for a five-year term in single-seat constituencies. There is also a House of Ariki, composed of chiefs, which has a purely advisory role. The Koutu Nui is a similar organization consisting of sub-chiefs. It was established by an amendment in 1972 of the 1966 House of Ariki Act. The current president is Te Tika Mataiapo Dorice Reid.

On June 13, 2008, a small majority of members of the House of Ariki attempted a coup, claiming to dissolve the elected government and to take control of the country's leadership. "Basically we are dissolving the leadership, the prime minister and the deputy prime minister and the ministers," chief Makea Vakatini Joseph Ariki explained. The Cook Islands Herald suggested that the ariki were attempting thereby to regain some of their traditional prestige or mana. Prime Minister Jim Marurai described the take-over move as "ill-founded and nonsensical". By June 23, the situation appeared to have normalised, with members of the House of Ariki accepting to return to their regular duties.

Judiciary

The judiciary is established by part IV of the Constitution, and consists of the High Court of the Cook Islands and the Cook Islands Court of Appeal. The Judicial Committee of the Privy Council serves as a final court of appeal. Judges are appointed by the Queen's Representative on the advice of the Executive Council as given by the Chief Justice and the Minister of Justice. Non-resident Judges are appointed for a three-year term; other Judges are appointed for life. Judges may be removed from office by the Queen's Representative on the recommendation of an investigative tribunal and only for inability to perform their office, or for misbehaviour.

With regard to the legal profession, Iaveta Taunga o Te Tini Short was the first Cook Islander to establish a law practice in 1968. He would later become a Cabinet Minister (1978) and High Commissioner for the Cook Islands (1985).

Political parties and elections

Recent political history

The 1999 election produced a hung Parliament.  Cook Islands Party leader Geoffrey Henry remained prime minister, but was replaced after a month by Joe Williams following a coalition realignment.  A further realignment three months later saw Williams replaced by Democratic Party leader Terepai Maoate.  A third realignment saw Maoate replaced mid-term by his deputy Robert Woonton in 2002, who ruled with the backing of the CIP.

The Democratic Party won a majority in the 2004 election, but Woonton lost his seat, and was replaced by Jim Marurai.  In 2005 Marurai left the Democrats due to an internal disputes, founding his own Cook Islands First Party.  He continued to govern with the support of the CIP, but in 2005 returned to the Democrats.  The loss of several by-elections forced a snap-election in 2006, which produced a solid majority for the Democrats and saw Marurai continue as prime minister.

In December 2009, Marurai sacked his Deputy Prime Minister, Terepai Maoate, sparking a mass-resignation of Democratic Party cabinet members He and new Deputy Prime Minister Robert Wigmore were subsequently expelled from the Democratic Party. Marurai appointed three junior members of the Democratic party to Cabinet, but on 31 December 2009 the party withdrew its support.

See also
 Foreign relations of the Cook Islands
 Political status of the Cook Islands and Niue

References

External links 
 Constitution of the Cook Islands and amendments